Výšovice is a municipality and village in Prostějov District in the Olomouc Region of the Czech Republic. It has about 500 inhabitants.

History
The first written mention of Výšovice is from 1348.

Notable people
Ondřej Přikryl (1862–1936), writer and politician

References

Villages in Prostějov District